Rosas para Verónica (English title:Roses for Veronica) is a Peruvian telenovela by Producciones Panamericana and directed by Carlos Barrios Porras for Panamericana Televisión.

Cast 
Saby Kamalich...Veronica 
Ignacio López Tarso...Ramiro
Carlos Estrada
Carlos Tuccio
Walter Rodriguez
Carola Duval 
Aracely Marquez
Maria Cristina Ribal 
Maria Isabel Chiri
Miguel Arnáiz

References 

Peruvian telenovelas
1971 telenovelas
Spanish-language telenovelas
1971 Peruvian television series debuts
1971 Peruvian television series endings